José Adrián Sornoza (born 5 August 1992 in Portoviejo) is an Ecuadorian triple jumper. He competed in the triple jump event at the 2012 Summer Olympics.

References

People from Portoviejo
Ecuadorian male triple jumpers
1992 births
Living people
Olympic athletes of Ecuador
Athletes (track and field) at the 2012 Summer Olympics
21st-century Ecuadorian people